Paracentrophyes is a genus of worms belonging to the family Neocentrophyidae.

The species of this genus are found in Europe, North America.

Species:

Paracentrophyes anurus 
Paracentrophyes praedictus 
Paracentrophyes quadridentatus 
Paracentrophyes sanchezae

References

Kinorhyncha